Troy Walter Mattes (born August 26, 1975) is a former Major League Baseball player. A pitcher, Mattes played for the Montreal Expos in 2001. Mattes spent six years (2007-2012) coaching in the Baltimore Orioles organization. He is currently the Pitching Coordinator at Inspiration Academy in Bradenton, FL.

Mattes played baseball and attended Riverview High School.

Mattes spent the past six years as a pitching coach with the Baltimore Orioles. After a 19-year playing-and-coaching career, Mattes retired from major league baseball at the end of the 2012 season to be able to stay close to home and spend more time with his wife, Kera, and daughters Ella and Eva.

References

External links

1975 births
Living people
Albany Polecats players
American expatriate baseball players in Canada
Baseball players from Illinois
Delmarva Shorebirds players
Edmonton Trappers players
Gulf Coast Expos players
Harrisburg Senators players
Jupiter Hammerheads players
Lancaster Barnstormers players
Long Island Ducks players
Major League Baseball pitchers
Montreal Expos players
Ottawa Lynx players
Vermont Expos players
West Palm Beach Expos players
Riverview High School (Sarasota, Florida) alumni